The High Commission of Trinidad and Tobago in London is the diplomatic mission of Trinidad and Tobago in the United Kingdom. It is located on Belgrave Square, in one of a group of Grade I listed buildings at Nos. 38–48.

The building can be seen in the 1956 film Around the World in 80 Days, where it used as the residence of Phileas Fogg (played by David Niven).

Gallery

References

External links
 Official site

Trinidad and Tobago
Diplomatic missions of Trinidad and Tobago
Trinidad and Tobago–United Kingdom relations
Grade I listed buildings in the City of Westminster
Belgravia